Dichagyris is a genus of moths of the family Noctuidae. The former genera Loxagrotis, Pseudorichia, Pseudorthosia and Mesembragrotis are now considered subgenera of Dichagyris. From Greek dikha-gyris 'apart, asunder; double' + 'the finest meal or flour'; English pronunciation: /digh-kuh-JIGH-riss/, IPA [dɑj•kə'dʒɑj•ɹɪs].

Species

 Dichagyris acclivis (Morrison, 1875)
 Dichagyris adelfi Nilsson & Svendsen, 1999
 Dichagyris amoena Staudinger, 1892
 Dichagyris anastasia (Draudt, 1936)
 Dichagyris arabella (Dyar, 1901)
 Dichagyris broui Lafontaine, 2004
 Dichagyris candelisequa (Denis & Schiffermüller, 1775)
 Dichagyris capota (Smith, 1908) (syn: Dichagyris capnota (Smith, 1908), misspelling)
 Dichagyris cataclivis (Dyar, 1910)
 Dichagyris celebrata (Alphéraky, 1897)
 Dichagyris celsicola (Bellier, 1859)
 Dichagyris constanti (Millière, 1860)
 Dichagyris cyminopristes (Dyar, 1912)
 Dichagyris devota (Christoph, 1884)
 Dichagyris dubitata McDunnough, 1933
 Dichagyris duskei Moberg & Fibiger, 1990
 Dichagyris elbursica (Draudt, 1937)
 Dichagyris endemica Svendsen & Nilsson, 1999
 Dichagyris eremicola (Standfuss, 1888)
 Dichagyris erubescens (Staudinger, 1891)
 Dichagyris exacta (Staudinger, 1888)
 Dichagyris fidelis (de Joannis, 1903)
 Dichagyris flammatra (Schiffermüller, 1775)
 Dichagyris flavina (Herrich-Schäffer, 1852)
 Dichagyris forcipula (Denis & Schiffermüller, 1775)
 Dichagyris forficula (Eversmann, 1851)
 Dichagyris gracilis (Wagner, 1929)
 Dichagyris grandipennis (Grote, 1883)
 Dichagyris grotei (Franclemont & Todd, 1983)
 Dichagyris herculea (Corti & Draudt, 1933)
 Dichagyris himalayensis Turati, 1933
 Dichagyris imperator (A. Bang-Haas, 1912)
 Dichagyris insula Fibiger, 1997
 Dichagyris iranicola Koçak, 1980
 Dichagyris juldussi (Alphéraky, 1882)
 Dichagyris kyune (Barnes, 1904)
 Dichagyris larga (Smith, 1908)
 Dichagyris leucomelas Brandt, 1941
 Dichagyris libanicola (Corti & Draudt, 1933)
 Dichagyris lobato (Barnes, 1904)
 Dichagyris longidens (Smith, 1890) (formerly Proragrotis longidens and Proagrotis longidens)
 Dichagyris lutescens (Eversmann, 1844)
 Dichagyris lux Nupponen & Fibiger, 2002
 Dichagyris madida (Guenée, 1852) (syn: Dichagyris hahama (Dyar, 1919))
 Dichagyris mansoura (Chrétien, 1911)
 Dichagyris melanura (Kollar, 1846)
 Dichagyris melanuroides Kozhantshikov, 1930
 Dichagyris mizteca (Schaus, 1894)
 Dichagyris multicuspis (Eversmann, 1852)
 Dichagyris musiva (Hübner, 1803)
 Dichagyris nachadira (Brandt, 1941)
 Dichagyris neoclivis (Barnes & Benjamin, 1924)
 Dichagyris nigrescens (Höfner, 1888)
 Dichagyris orientis (Alphéraky, 1882)
 Dichagyris pfeifferi (Corti & Draudt, 1933)
 Dichagyris plumbea (Alphéraky, 1887)
 Dichagyris polycala Lafontaine, 2004
 Dichagyris proclivis (Smith, [1888])
 Dichagyris pyrsogramma (Dyar, 1916)
 Dichagyris reliqua Lafontaine & Schweitzer, 2004
 Dichagyris renigera (Hübner, [1808])
 Dichagyris rhadamanthys (Reisser, 1958)
 Dichagyris romanovi (Christoph, 1885)
 Dichagyris rubidior (Corti, 1933)
 Dichagyris ruckesi Barnes & Benjamin, 1927
 Dichagyris salina (Barnes, 1904)
 Dichagyris serraticornis (Staudinger, 1897)
 Dichagyris signifera (Denis & Schiffermüller, 1775)
 Dichagyris singularis (Staudinger, 1892)
 Dichagyris socorro (Barnes, 1904) (syn: Dichagyris pampolycala (Dyar, 1912))
 Dichagyris soror Fibiger, 1997
 Dichagyris spissilinea (Staudinger, 1896)
 Dichagyris squalidior (Staudinger, 1901)
 Dichagyris squalorum (Eversmann, 1856)
 Dichagyris stellans (Corti & Draudt, 1933)
 Dichagyris sureyae (Draudt, 1938)
 Dichagyris terminicincta (Corti, 1933)
 Dichagyris timbor (Dyar, 1919)
 Dichagyris triphaenoides (Dyar, 1912)
 Dichagyris truculenta (Lederer, 1853)
 Dichagyris tyrannus (A. Bang-Haas, 1912)
 Dichagyris vallesiaca (Boisduval, [1837])
 Dichagyris variabilis (Grote, 1874)
 Dichagyris verecunda (Püngeler, 1898)
 Dichagyris wilsoni

References
 
 

Moth genera
Noctuinae